Linda Black may refer to:

 Linda Black (television presenter), American born, Singapore-based television host
 Linda Black (politician) (born 1970), member of the Missouri House of Representatives